Mainor is a surname. Notable people with the surname include:

Charles Mainor (born 1967), American politician
Kenny Mainor (born 1985), Canadian football player